The eleventh season of the American television sitcom The Big Bang Theory premiered on CBS on Monday, September 25, 2017. The series returned to its regular Thursday night time slot on November 2, 2017, after Thursday Night Football on CBS ended. The season concluded on May 10, 2018.

In March 2017, CBS renewed the series for two additional seasons, bringing its total to twelve and securing that the series would run through the 2018–19 television season.

Production
Like the previous three seasons, the first five episodes aired on Mondays due to CBS' contractual rights to air the Thursday Night Football games. After Thursday Night Football ended, the series returned to a Thursday schedule starting on November 2, 2017. Filming for the eleventh season began on August 15, 2017; it was also announced with the taping report that the premiere for the eleventh season would be titled "The Proposal Proposal". Before the season premiered, five episodes were filmed from August 15 to September 19, 2017.

According to TV Guide, Steve Holland announced on September 22, 2017, that both Bob Newhart and Wil Wheaton would return this season after their absences during Season 10.

Cast

Main cast
 Johnny Galecki as Dr. Leonard Hofstadter
 Jim Parsons as Dr. Sheldon Cooper
 Kaley Cuoco as Penny
 Simon Helberg as Howard Wolowitz
 Kunal Nayyar as Dr. Rajesh "Raj" Koothrappali
 Mayim Bialik as Dr. Amy Farrah Fowler
 Melissa Rauch as Dr. Bernadette Rostenkowski-Wolowitz
 Kevin Sussman as Stuart Bloom

Recurring cast
 Laurie Metcalf as Mary Cooper
 Christine Baranski as Dr. Beverly Hofstadter
 Stephen Hawking as himself
 Regina King as Janine Davis
 Brian Posehn as Dr. "Bert" Bertram Kibbler
 Wil Wheaton as himself
 Bob Newhart as Dr. Arthur Jeffries/Professor Proton
 John Ross Bowie as Dr. Barry Kripke
 Dean Norris as Colonel Richard Williams
 Brian Thomas Smith as Zack Johnson
 Brian George as Dr. V. M. Koothrappali
 Pamela Adlon as Halley Wolowitz (voice only)
 Joshua Malina as President Siebert
 Lauren Lapkus as Denise

Guest cast
 Riki Lindhome as Ramona Nowitzki
 Ira Flatow as himself
 Swati Kapila as Ruchi
 Beth Behrs as Nell
 Walton Goggins as Oliver
 Bill Gates as himself
 Megan McGown as Cynthia
 Peter MacNicol as Dr. Robert Wolcott
 Neil Gaiman as himself
 Jerry O'Connell as George Cooper Jr.
 Courtney Henggeler as Missy Cooper
 Teller as Larry Fowler
 Kathy Bates as Mrs. Fowler
 Mark Hamill as himself

Episodes

Ratings

References

General references

External links

2017 American television seasons
2018 American television seasons
The Big Bang Theory seasons